The Egyptian was a 1st-century messianic Jewish revolt leader. His uprising was quelled by the Roman procurator of Judea, Antonius Felix (ruled 52–60 CE), and the Egyptian fled, while many of his followers were killed and captured, with the remainder managing to flee and hide.

Flavius Josephus says in his Jewish War (2.261–262) 

In the Christian text, The Acts of the Apostles, the commander (chiliarch) of the Roman garrison in Jerusalem, Claudius Lysias, mistakes Paul for this Egyptian, saying "Aren’t you the Egyptian who started a revolt and led four thousand terrorists out into the wilderness some time ago?".

Belgian Catholic theologian Edward Schillebeeckx (1914–2009) characterised this Egyptian as an 'Egyptian Jewish eschatological miracle-working prophet' who predicted the destruction of Jerusalem's walls akin to the falling walls of Jericho in Joshua 6, and compared the Egyptian to Theudas during Roman procurator Cuspius Fadus (44–46 CE), and another 'eschatological prophet who led his followers into the wilderness while promising miracles and liberation from all misery' during Roman procurator Porcius Festus (r. 59–62 CE).

References 

1st-century births
1st-century deaths
Jewish messiah claimants
Judean people
Year of birth unknown
1st-century Jews
People in Acts of the Apostles
Prophets in Judaism